Abdon is an upland village and former civil parish, now in the parish of Abdon and Heath, in the Clee Hills area of English county of Shropshire.

History
 
The name Abdon derives from 'Ab(b)a's estate' (Old English personal name Ab(b)a + tūn).
It was called Abetune in the Domesday Book of 1086, when it comprised nine households, and was recorded as Ab(b)eton from about 1200 to 1504, Abbedon in 1301 and Abdon from 1503. 

The village had at least 11 households in 1642, 20 that paid hearth tax in 1662 and in 1793, there were 30 houses in the parish. The population of the parish grew from 137 to 170 between 1811 and 1831 but declined to 70 in 1971 and rose slightly to 85 in 1981.

Clee Hills
Abdon is a remote rural hamlet on the slopes of the Brown Clee Hill. The population currently stands at approx. 28 dwellings. The hamlet includes a parish church (St Margaret's), a village hall and the remains of a deserted medieval village. The hamlet is very close to the remains of an Iron Age hill fort now known as Nordy Bank, situated on the southern end of the Brown Clee. Abdon has a lively community, with regular events at the village hall.

The Abdon parish registers begin in the 1560s but are only complete from 1614 on, with a gap from 1641 to 1649.

Civil parish
The civil parish was large and included other settlements, including Tugford and Holdgate which were transferred into the parish in the late 20th century. The civil parish was abolished on 1 April 2017 and merged with Heath to form Abdon and Heath.

See also
Listed buildings in Abdon, Shropshire

References

'Abdon' in A History of the County of Shropshire. Volume 10: Munslow Hundred, The Liberty and Borough of Wenlock (1998), pp. 120–127. Available at British History Online: Abdon.

External links

 Abandoned Communities ... Deserted villages of Shropshire, including Abdon
 

Villages in Shropshire
Former civil parishes in Shropshire